Anna Slyu (born March 27, 1980) is a Russian film and television actress.

She graduated in 2001 from Boris Shchukin Theatre Institute (teacher Yuri Shlykov).

Selected filmography 
 Night Watch (2004), as Katya
 Day Watch (2005), as Katya
 My Fair Nanny (2006), as Azalea
 Nine Lives of Nestor Makhno (2005), as Halyna Kouzmenko
 Brothel Lights (2011), as Zygota
 Brief Guide To A Happy Life (2012), as Anya
 The Dark Side of the Moon (2016), as Victoria Alyabyeva
 Jumpman (2018), as Oksana
 Quiet Comes the Dawn (2019), as Lilya
  (2020), as Larisa
 Survivors  (2021), as Dr. Marina Lavrova

Music video
 Slava: Tell Me, Mom (2013)

Awards and nominations 
 Jumpman (2018)
 Kinotavr for Best Actress (won)
 Russian Guild of Film Critics for Best Actress (nominated)

References

Notes

Citations

External links 

 
 Anna Slyu on KinoPoisk
 

1980 births
Russian actresses
Living people
Actresses from Moscow
Russian film actresses
Russian television actresses
21st-century Russian actresses